1959 Egypt Cup Final, was the final match of 1958–59 Egypt Cup, between Zamalek & Al-Ahly, Zamalek won the match by 2–1.

Route to the final

Game description

Match details

References

External links 
 http://www.angelfire.com/ak/EgyptianSports/zamalekcup5859.html#Ahly

1959
EC 1959
Al Ahly SC matches